Seymour Lawrence Books was an imprint of Seymour Lawrence at:
Delacorte Press (1965–1983)
E. P. Dutton (1983–1988)
Houghton Mifflin (1988–1994)

External links 
 Seymour Lawrence papers at the University of Maryland libraries